Florian Pittiș (1943–2007) was a Romanian stage and television actor, theatre director, folk music singer, and radio producer.

He attended the Gheorghe Lazăr High School in Bucharest and in 1968 he graduated from the Institute of Theatre. As a young actor he was hired at one of the best theatres in Bucharest, the Bulandra Theatre, where he worked with directors such as Andrei Șerban, Liviu Ciulei, Alexandru Tocilescu. In the early '70s he studied in Paris with the well-known mime artist, Marcel Marceau.

In 1992, Pittiș was one of the founding members of the band Pasărea Colibri. In 1998, he became the director of Radio Romania Tineret, known as Radio3Net since 2001, the only Romanian radio station that broadcasts exclusively on the Internet.

Great admirer of Bob Dylan, he had masterfully translated and adapted some of Dylan's songs: A Hard Rain's A-Gonna Fall, Death is Not the End, Don't Think Twice, It's All Right, Mr. Tambourine Man, Rainy Day Women#12 & 35, She Belongs to Me, Silvio.

Pittiș had a very active life and he was loved both by his own generation and by the youth. Emblematic for his image was his long hair, his informal wear, and his habit of smoking "Carpaţi", a brand of filterless cigarettes. He was equally appreciated for his very particular voice, as a singer, on stage, and as a voice-over in television programs. He was called many superlative and admirative names such as "the prophet of the blue-jeans generation" and "the most beautiful voice in the Romanian theater".

In the Benelux and Norway he is remembered for his role as the Parrot in the 1976 Romanian-Soviet-French co-production children musical movie "Ma-ma", The English title of the movie was called "Rock'n Roll Wolf", it aired on Dutch Television in 1980, and it is known as "Med Grimm og Gru" in Norway, where the film first aired in 1983.

On 30 July 2007, Pittiș was admitted in serious condition at the Oncology Institute in Bucharest where he died a week later. For being popular in his own country he received an offer from Walt Disney Pictures in 1995, and provides the voice of Winnie-the-Pooh for the Romanian version of the series, The New Adventures of Winnie the Pooh, being among the first actors in the country to dub a Disney series in Romanian.

Stage activity
Lucius – Julius Caesar by William Shakespeare, director Andrei Șerban, 1968
Fleance – Macbeth by William Shakespeare, director Liviu Ciulei, 1968
Aurel – The End of the World by Victor Eftimiu, director , 1968
Camille –  A Flea in Her Ear by Georges Feydeau, director Emil Mandric, 1969
Collin Talbo –  The Grass Harp by Truman Capote, director Crin Teodorescu, 1970
Jeremy – Love for Love by William Congreve, director Emil Mandric, 1970
Arlechino – The Liar by Carlo Goldoni, director Sanda Manu, 1971
Valentin – Valentin and Valentina by Aleksei Arbuzov, director Adrian Georgescu, 1972
Feste – Twelfth Night, Or What You Will by William Shakespeare; director Liviu Ciulei, 1973
Count d'Aubigny – Elizabeth I by Paul Foster, director Liviu Ciulei, 1974
Alioska – The Lower Depths by Maxim Gorky, director Liviu Ciulei, 1975
Traian – Titanic Waltz by Tudor Mușatescu, director Toma Caragiu, 1975
Edmund – Long Day's Journey into Night by Eugene O'Neill, director Liviu Ciulei, 1976
Parrot – Ma-ma, director Elisabeta Bostan, 1976
Cricket – Veronica se întoarce, director Elisabeta Bostan, 1973
King Radu The Handsome – The Cold by Marin Sorescu, director Dan Micu, 1977
Piotr – The Philistines by Maxim Gorky, director Ioan Taub, 1978
Ariel – The Tempest by William Shakespeare, director Liviu Ciulei, 1978
Leonard Brazil – City Sugar by Stephen Poliakoff, director Florian Pittiș, 1980
Patriciu – Investigation on a Young Man by Adrian Dohotaru, director Petre Popescu, 1980
King Louis XIV – The Cabal of Hypocrites by Mihail Bulgakov, director Alexandru Tocilescu, 1982
M. Loyal – Tartuffe by Molière, director Alexandru Tocilescu, 1982
Laertes – Hamlet by William Shakespeare, director Alexandru Tocilescu, 1985
Teodoro – The Dog in the Manger by Lope de Vega, director Florian Pittiș, 1988
Philinte – The Misanthrope by Molière, director , 1989
Dr. Frank Bryant – Educating Rita by Willy Russell, director Florian Pittiș, 1989
Mortimer Brewster – Arsenic and Old Lace by Joseph Kesselring, director Grigore Gonta, 1991
Sonnenstich – Spring Awakening by Frank Wedekind, director Liviu Ciulei, 1991
Tiresias – Antigone by Sophocles, director Alexandru Tocilescu, 1993
Jack – Everything in the Garden by Edward Albee, director , 1997

As a director
 Facing the World (with Mircea Vintilă), 1979;
 City Sugar – by Stephen Poliakoff, 1980;
 The Dog in the Manger by Lope de Vega, 1988;
 Black and White by Keith Waterhouse and Willis Hall, 1997;
 Educating Rita by Willy Russel, 1989;
 Poezia muzicii tinere –  1981;
 Song of Myself – music show on the poetry of Walt Whitman, 1985.

Music
 Sunt tânăr, Doamnă... (2008);
 Cântece de bivuac (1999);
 Ciripituri (1998);
 În căutarea cuibului pierdut (1996);
 Nu trântiți ușa (Mircea Vintilă and Florian Pittiș), 1992.

See also
Music of Romania

References

External links
Florian Pittis's Home Page

Songs interpreted by Florian Pittiş on radio3net
Videos with Pittiş on YouTube
"Sunt cel mai frumos din orasul acesta" http://www.radio3net.ro/florian-pittis/

1943 births
2007 deaths
Burials at Bellu Cemetery
Deaths from cancer in Romania
Deaths from prostate cancer
Gheorghe Lazăr National College (Bucharest) alumni
Male actors from Bucharest
Romanian male film actors
Romanian male pop singers
Romanian radio presenters
Romanian male stage actors
20th-century Romanian male actors
20th-century Romanian male singers
20th-century Romanian singers
Musicians from Bucharest
Recipients of the Order of Cultural Merit (Romania)